Interim is a 1953 American short film drama directed by Stan Brakhage. It was the first film directed by Stan Brakhage, whose expansive filmography has made him an influential figure in experimental film.

Plot
The film contains no dialogue, starring only a man and a woman, who meet as if by chance and walk into the countryside together where they stop and kiss. They then return to town before parting again.

Production
The film was shot in black-and-white 16 mm film. Around the time of production, Brakhage was heavily influenced by Italian neorealism.

This was his first of many collaborations on film with composer and childhood friend James Tenney, who wrote the piano score for the film at the age of eighteen. In a foreword published by Brakhage, he cites a fault between himself and Tenney's mother for convincing Tenney to become a musician, shortly before composing the soundtrack for Interim.

Release
16 mm prints of the film are distributed by Canyon Cinema both for rent and for sale to institutions. The organization is also a licensee for many of Brakhage's filmography.

References

Sources

Further reading

External links
 

1953 films
Films directed by Stan Brakhage
American black-and-white films
1953 drama films
American drama short films
1950s English-language films
1950s American films